Setsuo (written: 節男, 節雄, 節生, 節夫 or 設雄) is a masculine Japanese given name. Notable people with the name include:

, Japanese sumo wrestler
, Japanese sumo wrestler
, Japanese voice actor
, Japanese rower
, Japanese basketball player
, Japanese politician
, Japanese politician

Japanese masculine given names